Rahimabad (also Romanized as Raḩīmābād) is a village in Garizat District, Garizat, Taft County, Yazd Province, Iran. At the 2006 census, its population was 322, in 79 families.

References 

Populated places in Taft County